is a passenger railway station located in the city of Maniwa, Okayama Prefecture, Japan, operated by West Japan Railway Company (JR West).

Lines

Station layout
The station consists of one ground-level side platform serving a single bi-directional track and a wooden station building. The station is unattended.

History
Mimasaka-Oiwake Station opened on August 21, 1923. With the privatization of the Japan National Railways (JNR) on April 1, 1987, the station came under the aegis of the West Japan Railway Company. The station building was rebuilt in 1994.

Passenger statistics
In fiscal 2019, the station was used by an average of 22 passengers daily..

See also
List of railway stations in Japan

References

External links

 Mimasaka-Oiwake Station Official Site

Railway stations in Okayama Prefecture
Kishin Line
Railway stations in Japan opened in 1923
Maniwa